Succisa pentaphylla is a species in the honeysuckle family. It was first described by German botanist Conrad Moench.

References

pentaphylla